Joanna Mary Salter  (born 27 August 1968, in Bournemouth) is a former Royal Air Force pilot, and was Britain's first female fast jet pilot flying the Panavia Tornado ground attack aircraft with 617 Squadron. She later became an inspirational speaker. In November 2016 she joined PwC as a director and Chief of Staff, responsible for digital capabilities within the People and Organisation practice.

Royal Air Force
Salter joined the Royal Air Force at the age of 18 with the intention of becoming an engineering officer but she went on to train as a pilot after the British government announced that women would be allowed to fly jet aircraft in 1992. As part of her engineering training she had studied at the Royal Military College of Science. Salter was awarded her wings on 3 April 1992 and at the end of 1992 she finished her fast jet training at RAF Brawdy with Dawn Hadlow (nee Bradley), who became Britain's first RAF female flight instructor.

In August 1994 Salter joined 617 Squadron at RAF Lossiemouth in August 1994 as a flight lieutenant, and was declared "combat ready" by the RAF on 21 February 1995. Salter was the first woman to be an operational Tornado pilot and she later flew from both Turkey and Saudi Arabia in protection of the no-fly zone over Iraq. Whilst flying ground attack Tornados, Salter started an MBA course with the Open University in 1996, being sponsored by the MoD, she completed the  course in 1999.

Following maternity leave Salter left the RAF in 2000 to become head of technical services with an IT infrastructure company.

Civilian career
Salter gives motivational talks, and trains ATC and University Air Squadron cadets at the weekend. She married Robert Ashfield in January 1998 in Broughton, Hampshire. They have two daughters (born July 1998 and December 2002).

She has written two books: Energy – 52 ways to fire up your life and become an Energy Angel (Trafford Publishing) and Energize (Hamlyn, Jan 2009).

Salter was appointed Member of the Order of the British Empire (MBE) in the 2022 New Year Honours for services to aviation.

See also
Julie Ann Gibson – first female pilot in the RAF

References

External links
 

Alumni of the Open University
British women aviators
English aviators
Military personnel from Bournemouth
1968 births
Living people
Women's Royal Air Force officers
Members of the Order of the British Empire